Asaperdina regularis is a species of beetle in the family Cerambycidae. It was described by Pic in 1923. It is known from China and Japan.

References

Desmiphorini
Beetles described in 1923